is a Japanese smartphone game developed by Line Games and Marvelous Entertainment, where players collect and fight with various anthropomorphized guns. It was released on Android and iOS devices in March 2018. An anime television series adaptation by TMS Entertainment and Double Eagle aired from July 3 to September 25, 2018. The game's official support ended on October 31, 2019.

Characters

Aleksandr

Ekaterina

Hall

Karl

Leopold

Margarita

Kiseru

Cane

Cutlery

Furusato

Kinbee

Media

Manga
A manga adaptation illustrated by Miki Daichi launched in June 2018 on Kadokawa Shoten's Young Ace magazine. In October 2019, it was announced that the manga would end on December 4. As of December 2019, two tankōbon volumes has been released.

Anime
Kenichi Kasai directed the anime at TMS Entertainment and Double Eagle. Takashi Aoshima is the series supervisor, Majiro is the character designer, and Hiroshi Takaki composed the music. The opening theme is "antique memory" by Taku Yashiro and Yoshiki Nakajima, and the ending theme is "BLACK MATRIX" by vistlip. Sentai Filmworks have licensed the anime and streamed it on Hidive. The series ran for 12 episodes. An OVA episode was released on March 6, 2019.

Notes

References

External links
 
 

2018 video games
Android (operating system) games
Anime television series based on video games
Fictional firearms
IOS games
Japan-exclusive video games
Kadokawa Shoten manga
Manga based on video games
Marvelous Entertainment
Seinen manga
Sentai Filmworks
TMS Entertainment
Video games developed in Japan